Aaron Marcus Evans (born June 17, 1996) is an American professional basketball player for the Cheshire Phoenix in the British Basketball League (BBL). He played college basketball for the Rice Owls and the VCU Rams.

High school career
Evans began his high school career at Great Bridge High School before transferring to Cape Henry Collegiate School. Evans averaged 12.6 points, five assists and four steals per game as a junior. As a senior, Evans led the team to a state title. He signed with Rice in June 2014.

College career
Evans was named Conference USA freshman of the week ten times, including the final six weeks. As a freshman, Evans led Rice in scoring at 21.4 points per game. He was named Conference USA Freshman of the Year and First-Team All-Conference USA. Evans averaged 19 points per game as a sophomore, setting the C-USA sophomore scoring record with 665 points. He was again named to the First Team All-Conference USA. After his sophomore season, coach Mike Rhoades left to become the coach of VCU and Evans decided to transfer. He ended up following Rhoades to VCU.

Evans was forced to sit out a season as a redshirt, but tore his ACL twice during his redshirt year. He scored nine points in his debut for VCU against Gardner-Webb. As a junior, Evans averaged 13.6 points, 3.2 assists, 3.1 rebounds and 1.9 steals per game. Evans was named to the First Team All-Atlantic 10 and All-Academic Team. Evans bruised his left knee in a loss in the Atlantic 10 tournament quarterfinals to Rhode Island. Playing through the pain, he returned for the NCAA tournament appearance and scored six points in the 73–58 loss to UCF in the round of 64.

Coming into his senior year, Evans was named to the Bob Cousy Award preseason watchlist. Evans was benched by the team on January 4, 2020 in a game against George Mason for a discipline issue. On January 28, Evans scored his 2,000th career point in a win against crosstown rival Richmond, finishing with nine points and three assists. He averaged 9.8 points and 2.8 assists per game as a senior.

Professional career 
On June 8, 2021, he signed his first professional contract with the Bristol Flyers of the British Basketball League.

Career statistics

College

|-
| style="text-align:left;"| 2015–16
| style="text-align:left;"| Rice
| 32 || 32 || 33.5 || .470 || .306 || .796 || 4.0 || 2.8 || 2.2 || .2 || 21.4
|-
| style="text-align:left;"| 2016–17
| style="text-align:left;"| Rice
| 35 || 34 || 31.7 || .425 || .376 || .787 || 3.3 || 3.7 || 1.1 || .1 || 19.0
|-
| style="text-align:left;"| 2017–18
| style="text-align:left;"| VCU
| style="text-align:center;" colspan="11"|  Redshirt
|-
| style="text-align:left;"| 2018–19
| style="text-align:left;"| VCU
| 33 || 30 || 26.8 || .427 || .273 || .773 || 3.1 || 3.2 || 2.0 || .2 || 13.6
|-
| style="text-align:left;"| 2019–20
| style="text-align:left;"| VCU
| 25 || 22 || 23.6 || .370 || .379 || .743 || 1.9 || 2.8 || 1.4 || .1 || 9.8
|- class="sortbottom"
| style="text-align:center;" colspan="2"| Career
| 125 || 118 || 29.3 || .433 || .333 || .780 || 3.1 || 3.2 || 1.7 || .1 || 16.4

References

External links
VCU Rams bio
Rice Owls bio

1996 births
Living people
American expatriate basketball people in the United Kingdom
American men's basketball players
Basketball players from Virginia
Bristol Flyers players
Point guards
People from Midlothian, Virginia
Rice Owls men's basketball players
VCU Rams men's basketball players
American expatriate sportspeople in England
Cheshire Phoenix players